Nemanja Milošević (born July 4, 1987) is a Montenegrin professional basketball player who currently plays for GGMT Vienna of the [[Austrian Basketball Superliga
]].

Professional career
Milošević started his career in his home country with power house Budućnost Podgorica. He won the league title with Podgorica.

In 2012, he signed with Mornar Bar. In November 2012, he left Mornar and signed in Bulgaria with Yambol.

In December 2013, Milošević signed with Ford Burgos, of the Spanish LEB Oro league. However, he only could play two games due to the club was sanctioned by FIBA. Finally, he left the team in February 2014.

After leaving Spain, Milošević signed with Energia Rovinari of the Romanian League for finishing the league. He extended his contract for the 2014–15 season.

On 24 June 2015, Milošević signed with Italian club Enel Brindisi for the 2015–16 season.

On August 16, 2016, Milošević signed with Belarusian club Tsmoki-Minsk. On March 22, 2017, he left Minsk and signed with French club Orléans Loiret Basket for the rest of the 2016–17 Pro A season.

On July 28, 2017, Milošević signed with Romanian club CSM Oradea for the 2017–18 season.

Milošević spent the 2019–20 season with Studentski centar, averaging 16.7 points, 8.4 rebounds, and 2.3 assists per game. On September 28, 2021, he signed with MZT Skopje of the Macedonian League.

Montenegro national team
Milošević was called by the Montenegrin basketball team for the first time in May 2015, for playing the Games of the Small States of Europe at Iceland.

References

External links
Nemanja Milošević at eurobasket.com
Nemanja Milošević at fiba.com
Nemanja Milošević at interperformances.com

1987 births
Living people
BC Yambol players
BC Tsmoki-Minsk players
KK Budućnost players
KK Mornar Bar players
Montenegrin men's basketball players
New Basket Brindisi players
Orléans Loiret Basket players
Power forwards (basketball)
Western Kentucky Hilltoppers basketball players